For the western spruce bud worm previously known as Choristoneura occidentalis, please see Choristoneura freemani

Choristoneura occidentalis is a species of moth of the family Tortricidae. It is found in the Democratic Republic of Congo, South Africa, Tanzania and Gambia.

The larvae feed on Maesopsis eminii, Pinus patula, Vigna unguiculata, Allium cepa, Cajanus, Citrus (including Citrus aurantium), Coffea (including Coffea arabica), Corchorus, Cupressus lusitanica, Eucalyptus camaldulensis, Eucalyptus torelliana, Glycine max and Gossypium species.

Taxonomy
The name Choristoneura occidentalis was also used by Freeman for the North American western spruce budworm. However, this name was already in use by the species described by Walsingham. The replacement name for the North American species is Choristoneura freemani.

References

Moths described in 1891
Choristoneura